Elsa is a city in Hidalgo County, Texas, United States. The population was 7,181 at the 2020 census, It is part of the McAllen–Edinburg–Mission and Reynosa–McAllen metropolitan areas.

Geography 

It is bordered to the east by the city of Edcouch and to the west by the unincorporated community of La Blanca.

Demographics

2020 census 

As of the 2020 United States census, there were 5,668 people, 2,093 households, and 1,735 families residing in the city.

2000 census 
As of the census of 2000, there were 5,549 people, 1,575 households, and 1,324 families residing in the city. The population density was 3,756.8 people per square mile (1,447.6/km). There were 1,754 housing units at an average density of 1,187.5 per square mile (457.6/km). The racial makeup of the city was 74.5% White, 0.34% African American, 0.45% Native American, 0.05% Asian, 21.7% from other races, and 2.97% from two or more races. Hispanic or Latino of any race were 97.28% of the population.

There were 1,575 households, out of which 44.2% had children under the age of 18 living with them, 55.7% were married couples living together, 22.3% had a female householder with no husband present, and 15.9% were non-families. 14.9% of all households were made up of individuals, and 8.6% had someone living alone who was 65 years of age or older. The average household size was 3.52 and the average family size was 3.90.

In the city, the population was spread out, with 34.7% under the age of 18, 11.4% from 18 to 24, 25.0% from 25 to 44, 17.3% from 45 to 64, and 11.6% who were 65 years of age or older. The median age was 28 years. For every 100 females, there were 90.3 males. For every 100 females age 18 and over, there were 86.0 males.

The median income for a household in the city was $19,232, and the median income for a family was $21,831. Males had a median income of $21,957 versus $17,107 for females. The per capita income for the city was $7,550. About 33.5% of families and 38.3% of the population were below the poverty line, including 51.9% of those under age 18 and 32.2% of those age 65 or over.

Government and infrastructure 
The United States Postal Service operates the Elsa Post Office.

Education 
Elsa is served by the Edcouch-Elsa Independent School District.  In addition, South Texas Independent School District operates magnet schools that serve the community.

The Elsa Public Library is located in Elsa.

History 
Elsa was settled as ranch land before 1800. Anglo-Americans settled in the area in the early 1900s; the town was laid out with the coming of the Texas and New Orleans Railroad in 1927, and incorporated in 1940.
 
The Ro-Tel brand of tomatoes and green chile, now known as a basic ingredient of Tex-Mex cooking, began in 1943 as a family canning plant in Elsa established by Carl Roetelle.

References

External links 
 City of Elsa official website
 Elsa Public Library

Cities in Texas
Cities in Hidalgo County, Texas